Seobusan Yutongjigu Station is a station of the BGLRT Line of Busan Metro in Daejeo-dong, Gangseo District, Busan, South Korea.

Station Layout

Vicinity
Exit 1: KEM Co., Ltd, Air Busan Headquarters
Exit 2: Shinhan Bank

External links
  Cyber station information from Busan Transportation Corporation

Busan Metro stations
Busan–Gimhae Light Rail Transit
Gangseo District, Busan
Railway stations opened in 2011